Balendukht or Balendokht was a Sasanian princess and queen consort of Iberia. She was the daughter of Sasanian shah (king) Hormizd III. During her youth, she married Vakhtang I, the ruler of Iberia, with whom she had one child named Dachi. Balendukht, however, died of childbirth when the latter and his twin-sister were born. The etymology of the name is unclear. It may have been a corrupted from *Šāhēnduxt.

Notes

References 

5th-century deaths
Sasanian princesses
Year of birth unknown
5th-century Iranian people
Queens consort from Georgia (country)
Deaths in childbirth